Dietmar Schauerhammer (born 12 August 1955 in Neustadt an der Orla, Bezirk Gera) is an East German two-time Winter Olympic champion, pentathlete, decathlete and bob pusher for six-time World champion, two-time Olympic champion, four-time European champion, two-time German champion and five-time GDR champion Wolfgang Hoppe who competed during the 1980s. Competing in two Winter Olympics, he won three medals with two golds (two-man: 1984, Four-man: 1984) and one silver (four-man: 1988).

Schauerhammer also won five medals at the FIBT World Championships with two golds (two-man: 1985, 1986), one silver (four-man: 1987), and two bronzes (two-man: 1983, 1987). In October 1986, he was awarded a Star of People's Friendship in gold (second class) for his sporting success.

References

 Bobsleigh two-man Olympic medalists 1932–56 and since 1964
 Bobsleigh four-man Olympic medalists for 1924, 1932–56, and since 1964
 Bobsleigh four-man world championship medalists since 1930
 Bobsleigh two-man world championship medalists since 1931

External links
 
 

1955 births
Living people
People from Neustadt an der Orla
People from Bezirk Gera
German male bobsledders
Sportspeople from Thuringia
Olympic bobsledders of East Germany
Bobsledders at the 1984 Winter Olympics
Bobsledders at the 1988 Winter Olympics
Olympic gold medalists for East Germany
Olympic silver medalists for East Germany
Olympic medalists in bobsleigh
Medalists at the 1984 Winter Olympics
Medalists at the 1988 Winter Olympics
Recipients of the Patriotic Order of Merit in gold